Ku Karthik, known by his stage name K Karthik, is an Indian lyricist working on Tamil language films. His debut film was Paandiyoda Galatta Thaangala. He has written lyrics for more than 70 songs.

Filmography

As a song lyricist

References 

Living people
Tamil-language lyricists
Year of birth missing (living people)